Nafisah Ahmad al-Amin is an Sudanese politician. She served as Deputy Minister of Youth and Sport in 1971-1972. She was the first woman cabinet minister in Sudan.

References

Government ministers of Sudan
20th-century Sudanese women politicians
20th-century Sudanese politicians
Women government ministers of Sudan